Mireille Gigandet-Donders (née Mireille Donders; born 7 July 1974) is a retired Swiss athlete who specialised in sprinting events. She represented her country at the 1996 and 2000 Summer Olympics without reaching the second round. She won the bronze medal in the 100 metres at the 2001 Summer Universiade.

She broke the Swiss record in several events. Her record in the indoor 200 metres is still standing.

Competition record

Personal bests
Outdoor
100 metres – 11.34 (+0.8 m/s) (Geneva 2001) former NR
200 metres – 23.06 (+1.2 m/s) (Lugano 2000)
Indoor
60 metres – 7.27 (Magglingen 1998) former NR
200 metres – 22.96 (Valencia 1998) former NR

References

1974 births
Living people
Swiss female sprinters
Athletes (track and field) at the 1996 Summer Olympics
Athletes (track and field) at the 2000 Summer Olympics
Olympic athletes of Switzerland
Universiade medalists in athletics (track and field)
Universiade bronze medalists for Switzerland
Competitors at the 1997 Summer Universiade
Competitors at the 1999 Summer Universiade
Medalists at the 2001 Summer Universiade